The Shanghai–Nanjing or Huning Railway is a  railway in China running from Shanghai to Nanjing. The Huning line is one of the busiest in China.

The Shanghai–Nanjing intercity railway runs along the same route, but on parallel tracks.

Its Chinese name is derived from the character abbreviations Hù (s , t ) for Shanghai and Níng (s , t ) for Nanjing.

History
Such a railway had long been desired by Western interests in 19th-century China and just as long opposed by the Qing government. Following China's disastrous failure in the First Sino-Japanese War, however, the Guangxu Emperor approved the construction of the Shanghai–Nanjing line as a western extension of the existing Songhu Railway. The project was undertaken by the civil engineering partnership Sir John Wolfe-Barry and Lt Col Arthur John Barry at the end of the nineteenth century.  Its former eastern terminus at the Old North Station in Shanghai's Zhabei District (the former American district of the International Settlement) is now the Shanghai Railway Museum.

From 1928 to 1949, while Nanjing was the capital of the Republic, the line was known as the Jinghu Railway, a name now reserved for the line between Beijing and Shanghai.
In 2007 during the Sixth Railway Speed-Up Campaign, the line was organized into the Beijing–Shanghai railway

See also

 Jinghu Railway, the modern railway between Beijing and Shanghai
 Shanghai–Nanjing intercity railway

Notes

References

Railway lines in China